This list of churches in Lyngby-Taarbæk Municipality lists church buildings in Lyngby-Taarbæk Municipality, Denmark.

National Churches

Christian's Church

Christian's Church is located in Kongens Lyngby. It is the only national church in Christians Parish.

The church was founded in 1941, though preparations for the church and a new parish began already in 1934. The church was built by architects Jacob E. Bang and Erik Jensen. The church was opened 3rd Sunday of Advent. King Christian X was present at the opening, and the church is named after him.

There are two church bells in the church, both cast in 1941. They were cast by the foundry "B. Løw & Søn København".

Geel Church Hall

Geel Church Hall is located in Brede. It is one of two churches in Lundtofte Parish.

The church was built in a former local shop, and was opened on 17 March 1991.

Lundtofte Church

Lundtofte Church is located in Lundtofte. It is one of two churches in Lundtofte Parish. The church has a churchyard with a cemetery.

The church was opened in 1921.

Lyngby Church

Lyngby Church is located in Kongens Lyngby. It is the only national church in Kongens Lyngby Parish. The church has a churchyard with a cemetery.

The first constructions of the church originate from 1100. A tower was built in the 1400s and the church was rebuilt around year 1500. The church underwent an extensive restoration between 1914–1916 and again in 2011–2012.

Sorgenfri Church

Sorgenfri Church is located in Sorgenfri. It is the only national church in Sorgenfri Parish.

The church was built in year 1966 by architect Tyge Hvass.

Taarbæk Church

Taarbæk Church is located in Taarbæk. It is the only national church in Taarbæk Parish. The church has a churchyard with a cemetery.

The church was opened in 1864, the cemetery in 1905 and the parish became independent in 1907. The church underwent a minor restoration in 2003.

Virum Church

Virum Church is located in Virum. It is the only national church in Virum Parish.

The crypt of the church was opened on 28 November 1937, and the church itself was opened on 30 June 1940. The church's architect was Niels Skrivers, who became the first to be buried at the church. Architect Palle Møller was behind a rebuilding in 1957–1959.

Other churches

Lyngby Baptist Church

Lyngby Baptist Church is located in Kongens Lyngby.

The congregation in Lyngby was founded in 1951 and the church was built in 1967.

Lyngby Independent Church

Lyngby Independent Church, also known as Apostolic Church Lyngby (Danish: Apostolsk Kirke Lyngby) is located in Kongens Lyngby.

Saint Canute Lavard Church

Saint Canute Lavard Church is a Catholic church located in Kongens Lyngby.

Chapels

Lyngby Park Cemetery Chapel

Lyngby Park Cemetery Chapel is located in Lyngby Park Cemetery in Lundtofte.

Sorgenfri Cemetery Chapel

Sorgenfri Cemetery Chapel is located in Sorgenfri Cemetery in Sorgenfri.

References

Churches
Lyngby-Taarbæk